Anteos maerula, the angled sulphur or yellow angled-sulphur, is a butterfly of the  family Pieridae. It is found from Peru to Mexico. Rarely, migrants can be found up to eastern Nebraska, south-eastern Arizona, south-western New Mexico, southern Texas, Mississippi and Florida.

The wingspan is 82–117 mm. The upperside of the males is bright yellow, while females are paler. Both sexes have a black spot in the forewing cell. Adults feed on the nectar from red and purple flowers, including Hibiscus and Bougainvilla species.

The larvae feed on Cassia species, including Cassia emarginata.

References

F. Martin Brown and Bernard Heineman, Jamaica and its Butterflies (E. W. Classey, London 1972), Plate VII

Coliadinae
Butterflies of North America
Butterflies of Central America
Butterflies of the Caribbean
Pieridae of South America
Butterflies of Cuba
Butterflies of Jamaica
Butterflies described in 1775
Taxa named by Johan Christian Fabricius